Aberdeen F.C. competed in the Scottish Football League Division One and the Scottish Cup in season 1906–07.

Overview

This was Aberdeen's fourth season overall and second in the top flight. Aberdeen finished 11th out of 18 clubs in Division One, but were knocked out of the Scottish Cup by Renfrewshire club Johnstone after a replay. New signings included Irish international Charlie O'Hagan from Middlesbrough.

Results

Scottish División One

Final standings

Scottish Cup

Squad

Appearances & Goals

|}

References

Aberdeen F.C. seasons
Aberdeen